Eduardo Godinho Felipe de Souza (born 8 March 1981), known as Edu Souza, is a Brazilian retired footballer who played as a striker.

Club career
Born in São Paulo, Souza spent the vast majority of his professional career in Portugal, amassing Primeira Liga totals of 15 games and one goal for C.D. Trofense in the 2008–09 season.

References

External links

1981 births
Living people
Footballers from São Paulo
Brazilian footballers
Association football forwards
Grêmio Barueri Futebol players
Primeira Liga players
Liga Portugal 2 players
Segunda Divisão players
A.D. Ovarense players
C.D. Trofense players
F.C. Arouca players
G.D. Chaves players
S.C. Espinho players
Brazilian expatriate footballers
Expatriate footballers in Portugal
Brazilian expatriate sportspeople in Portugal